Wacław Iwaszkiewicz-Rudoszański  (26 August 1871 – 25 November 1922) was a Polish general.

He was born in Omsk on 26 August 1871, and served in the Russian Imperial Army until the October Revolution. He was active in the defense of the fortress of Port Arthur during the Russo-Japanese War. During World War I, he was colonel of the 54th Siberian Infantry Division, and participated in the Battle of Łódź and in the defense of Warsaw against the German Army. In 1915 he was promoted to the rank of general.

After the Russian Revolution in 1917 he joined the forming Polish Army. He commanded the 3rd Polish Rifleman Division of the Polish I Corps in Russia. He took part in the Polish-Ukrainian War of 1918 and 1919 and the Polish-Soviet War of 1918–1921, commanding respectively the 1st Lithuanian–Belarusian Division, Polish Eastern Army, the Galician-Volhynian, Galician and Podolian fronts, 6th Army and the Southern Front. He was decorated with Virtuti Militari twice - in 1920 and 1922. He retired after the war. He died in 1922, receiving a state funeral.

References

Peter Stawecki, Biographical Dictionary of the Polish Army generals 1918–1939, Bellona Publishing House, Warsaw 1994, 

1871 births
1922 deaths
Military personnel  from Omsk
People from Akmolinsk Oblast (Russian Empire)
People from the Russian Empire of Polish descent
Polish generals in the Imperial Russian Army
Polish generals
Russian military personnel of the Russo-Japanese War
Russian military personnel of World War I
Polish people of the Polish–Ukrainian War
Polish people of the Polish–Soviet War
Commanders of the Virtuti Militari
Recipients of the Silver Cross of the Virtuti Militari
Commanders of the Order of Polonia Restituta
Recipients of the Cross of Valour (Poland)
Burials at Lychakiv Cemetery